Chicana is a 1979 short documentary film by director Sylvia Morales overviewing the history of the Chicana figure from the pre-Columbian era to the Chicano Movement. The film has a run time of 22 minutes. In 2021, it was selected to be added to the National Film Registry by the Library of Congress. The film is often discussed among other Chicano films as a Chicana perspective on film.

Background 
Sylvia Morales made the film while she was a student at UCLA. The film has been referred to the first documentary done through a Chicana feminist lens.

Reception 
A review for the Los Angeles Times referred to it as "well-researched and [a] spirited documentary made with much love."

Credits 

 Anna Nieto-Gómez - Research
 Cynthia Honesto - Research
 Carmen Moreno - Music
 Carmen Zapata - Narration
 Dolores Huerta - Interview
 Alicia Escalante - Interview
 Francisca Flores - Interview

References 

Chicana feminism
Chicano art
1979 short films
1979 independent films
1979 documentary films
1979 films
1970s short documentary films
American independent films
American short documentary films
1970s English-language films
1970s American films